Jørn Nielsen is a former Danish mobster and high-ranking Hells Angels member.

Life
Nielsen's criminal career began in 1975 when he was arrested for fighting at a bar as a 15-year-old. In 1978, he was sentenced to two and a half years in prison for stabbing another man in a bar. He bought his first motorcycle in 1978 and when he was released from prison in 1980, he founded the Hells Angels Motorcycle Club's first chapter in Denmark, located in Nørrebro, Copenhagen.

In 1984, Nielsen murdered Henning Norbert Knudsen ("Makrel"), President of Bullshit MC. He then fled to Canada but was apprehended and given a sixteen-year prison sentence. He was transferred to a Danish prison in 1988 and in 1996, attempts were made on his life by Bandidos, when the "Great Nordic Biker War" raged. He was paroled in summer 1998, but was put back into prison in 2001 after the death of a man at an Aalborg nightclub in August 2001. He was sentenced to four years in prison.

On 27 December 2007, Nielsen was attacked and stabbed in the streets of Nørrebro. During the ensuing fight the perpetrator was also stabbed, and consequently Nielsen was arrested. He remained in custody until 15 October 2008. On 6 February 2009, Nielsen was acquitted of aggravated assault.

On 18 November 2020, Nielsen informed on his Facebook account that he had been kicked out of the club. According to several newspaper articles Nielsen was booted from the club with status  "out" which, in effect, means so called bad standing.

References

1960 births
Living people
Danish gangsters
Danish expatriates in Canada
Danish people convicted of murder
Danish people imprisoned abroad
Danish prisoners and detainees
Hells Angels
Gang members
People from Gladsaxe Municipality
People acquitted of assault